Yevgeni Alekseyevich Lebedev (January 15, 1917, Balakovo – June 9, 1997, Saint Petersburg) was a Soviet and Russian actor and pedagogue. People's Artist of the USSR (1968). Hero of Socialist Labour (1987).

Biography 
Yevgeni Lebedev was born in Balakovo (now — Saratov Oblast), in the family of a priest, and later was forced to hide his origin.

Family 
Wife - Natela Tovstonogova (1926-2013), a sister of Georgy Tovstonogov.

Son - Aleksey Lebedev (born 1952), a film director.

Partial filmography

Rimsky-Korsakov (1953) as Kashchey the Deathless in opera (uncredited)
Unfinished Story (1955) as Fyodor Ivanovich
Two Captains (1956) as Romashov
Virgin Soil Upturned (1960) as Agafon Dubtsov
Going Inside a Storm (1966) as Agatov
Wedding in Malinovka (1967) as Nechipor
An Incident that no one noticed (1967) as Yakov Alexeyevich
No Path Through Fire (1968) as colonel
Straight Line (1968) as Neslezkin
Subject for a Short Story (1969) as Pavel Yegorovich Chekhov
Strange People (1970) (segment "Rokovoj vystrel")
Crime and Punishment (1970) as Marmeladov
The Beginning (1970) as Cauchon
Adventures of the Yellow Suitcase (1970) as children's doctor
Interrogation (1979) as cellmate
Centaurs (1979) as General Pin
Life Is Beautiful (1979) as Rostao
Squadron of Flying Hussars (1981) as  Mikhail Kutuzov
Sikimoku (1993) as Kseniya Ivanovna Nekrasova, old woman 
To whom will God send (1994) (final film role)

Awards and honors
 Honored Artist of the RSFSR (1953)
 People's Artist of the RSFSR (1962)  
 People's Artist of the USSR (1968)
 Hero of Socialist Labour (1987)
 Two Orders of Lenin (1971, 1987)
  Order "For Merit to the Fatherland", 3rd class (1997)
 Medal For the Defence of the Caucasus (1945)
 Medal For Valiant Labour in the Great Patriotic War 1941–1945 (1945)
 Medal In Commemoration of the 250th Anniversary of Leningrad (1957)
 Order of the Red Banner of Labour (1977)
Badge For services to Polish culture (1979)
 Medal "Veteran of Labour" (1984)
 Lenin Prize (1986)
   USSR State Prize first-degree (1950)
 USSR State Prize (1968)
 Vasilyev Brothers State Prize of the RSFSR (1980)
 The prize Golden Nymph International Festival in Monte Carlo (1977)
 The award of the KGB of the USSR in the field of literature and art of I degree (1984) 
 Award St. Petersburg Mayor Anatoly Sobchak For outstanding achievements in the development of culture (1994)
 Highest theater prize Saint-Petersburg Gold spotlights - special prize For creative longevity and unique contribution to the theatrical culture (1996) [10]
 Mar del Plata International Film Festival for Best Actor (1966)
Honorary Citizen of Balakovo (1987) 
Honorary citizen of Tbilisi (1992) 
Honorary Citizen of St. Petersburg (1996)

References

External links
 
 

1917 births
1997 deaths
People from Balakovo
Heroes of Socialist Labour
Honored Artists of the RSFSR
People's Artists of the RSFSR
People's Artists of the USSR
Recipients of the Decoration of Honor Meritorious for Polish Culture
Recipients of the Order "For Merit to the Fatherland", 3rd class
Recipients of the Order of Lenin
Recipients of the Order of the Red Banner of Labour
Recipients of the USSR State Prize
Recipients of the Vasilyev Brothers State Prize of the RSFSR
Stalin Prize winners
Lenin Prize winners
Russian male film actors
Russian male stage actors
Russian male television actors
Russian male voice actors
Soviet male film actors
Soviet male stage actors
Soviet male television actors
Soviet male voice actors